The consensus 1965 College Basketball All-American team, as determined by aggregating the results of four major All-American teams.  To earn "consensus" status, a player must win honors from a majority of the following teams: the Associated Press, the USBWA, The United Press International and the National Association of Basketball Coaches.

1965 Consensus All-America team

Individual All-America teams

AP Honorable Mention:

Dave Bing, Syracuse
Dick Ellis, New Mexico
John Fairchild, Brigham Young
Hank Finkel, Dayton
Matt Guokas, St. Joseph's
Clem Haskins, Western Kentucky
Lou Hudson, Minnesota
Jim Jarvis, Oregon State
Ollie Johnson, San Francisco
Tom Kerwin, Centenary
Jim King, Oklahoma State
Jack Marin, Duke
Toby Kimball, Connecticut
Dub Malaise, Texas Tech
Rick Park, Tulsa
Chris Pervall, Iowa
Flynn Robinson, Wyoming
Willie Somerset, Duquesne
Steve Thomas, Xavier
Dick Van Arsdale, Indiana
Tom Van Arsdale, Indiana
Jim Washington, Villanova
Bob Weiss, Penn State
Walt Wesley, Kansas
Lonnie Wright, Colorado State

Academic All-Americans
On March 24, 1965, CoSIDA announced the 1965 Academic All-America team. The following is the 1964-65 Academic All-America Men’s Basketball Team as selected by CoSIDA:

See also
 1964–65 NCAA University Division men's basketball season

References

NCAA Men's Basketball All-Americans
All-Americans